The Almoravid Qubba, or Qubba Ba'adiyyin/Barudiyyin, is a small monument in Marrakech, Morocco. It was erected by the Almoravid dynasty in the early 12th century. It is notable for its extraordinary decoration and for being one of the only remnants of Almoravid architecture in Marrakech.

History 
The Almoravid Qubba is situated next to the Marrakech Museum and around 40 meters south of the Mosque of Ben Youssef. It is the only surviving example of Almoravid architecture in Marrakesh. It was built in either 1117 or, more likely, in 1125, by the Almoravid amir Ali ibn Yusuf. Most scholars today believe that it belonged to the nearby Ben Youssef Mosque, the main mosque of the city at the time, and that it was a pavilion used for ritual ablutions before prayer. The mosque itself, also originally built by Ali ibn Yusuf, has since been completely rebuilt in more recent centuries. This type of structure for providing water near a mosque was also known as a mida'a ("ablutions facility") and is found in later mosques in Marrakech.

The existence of the Qubba was first documented by French scholars in 1947, with architectural historian Boris Maslow publishing notes about in 1948. In the following years, more thorough excavations and studies were carried out under the direction of Henri Terrasse and Jacques Meunié. Due to the rising ground level and the construction of other structures around it, over half of the Qubba was buried under 7-8 meters of debris. The French scholars refrained from any significant reconstruction or restoration, leaving the structure essentially as found, and published their findings in the 1950s. In the decades since its excavation it has become a historic monument and tourist attraction.

Description

The domed pavilion 
The dome (qubba) tops a rectangular building, measuring 7.35 by 5.45 meters, sheltering a water basin. The whole structure is 12 meters tall. Materials used include stone, brick, and cedar wood. The interior is richly decorated with carved floral and vegetal patterns (pine cones, palms and acanthus leaves), palmette/seashell shapes, and calligraphy. Its cupola has been compared to the domes of the Great Mosque of Cordoba and the Bab al-Mardum Mosque in Toledo (both older buildings from Spanish Ummayyad architecture). In the corners, between the wings of the cupola and the rectangular outer walls, are four miniature cupolas carved with some of the earliest muqarnas decoration in Morocco. Since muqarnas decoration would have originated in Abbasid architecture in the Middle East, at least one scholar has suggested that this combination of Cordoban Ummayyad and Abbasid motifs was a deliberate stylistic choice by the Almoravid ruler to invoke a shared legacy and heritage with these caliphates. Around the interior of the pavilion is an Arabic inscription, now badly damaged, which details the foundation of the structure and cites the name of Ali ibn Yusuf and the date of construction, although the year of the date is unfortunately unreadable (leading to scholarly debate about the exact date).

Other structures around the pavilion 
A series of private latrines, possibly built at a later period, have also been excavated all around the domed building. Next to the domed building was also a monumental fountain or water source in another rectangular structure measuring around 14.5 by 4.5 meters. The structure was open to the street via three arched openings, with each bay occupied by a water basin and a water trough along its back wall. This fountain structure is reminiscent, in its basic form, of later wall fountains of Marrakech like those of the Mouassine Mosque or of the Shrob ou Shouf Fountain. 

The water for this fountain and the ablutions kiosk was drawn via bronze pipes from a nearby cistern covered by a barrel vault, which can be found today behind these structures. The supply of water to this cistern probably relied in turn on the revolutionary hydraulics of khettaras, a drainage system characteristic of historic Morocco.

Notes

References

Further reading
Terasse, H., "L'Art de l'empire Almoravide, ses sources et son évolution", Studia Islamica, III, 1955.
Meunié, J. and Terrasse, H., Nouvelles recherches archéologiques à Marrakech, Paris, 1957.

External links
 Extensive information (WNF) website
Almoravid Qubba in the Manar al-Athar digital photo archive 

Buildings and structures completed in the 12th century
Almoravid architecture
Buildings and structures in Marrakesh